Ascan Lutteroth (5 October 1842, Hamburg - 2 February 1923, Hamburg) was a German landscape painter; associated with the Düsseldorfer Malerschule.

Biography 
His grandfather, was a merchant and served in the Hamburg Parliament as a Senator.. His father, Christian Alexander Ascan Lutteroth (1812-1867), was a prominent banker. From 1861, he studied with Alexandre Calame in Geneva then, from 1864 to 1867, with Oswald Achenbach at the Kunstakademie Düsseldorf.

He lived in Italy from 1868 to 1870, mostly on Capri, then moved to Berlin. He returned to Hamburg in 1877, where he was awarded a commission to paint three large pictures for the Town Hall.

In 1879, he paid a lengthy visit to San Remo. While there, he served as a tutor for Crown Princess Victoria, who was an amateur painter. Most of his best known earlier landscapes are of Italy.

In 1890, Kaiser Wilhelm II named him a Professor. After that, he confined his painting to the area around Hamburg.

He was represented at numerous international exhibitions. His works were acquired by the National Gallery (Berlin) and the Rudolfinum in Prague, but are not currently on display; placed in storage in favor of more modern works. In 2019, his works were part of an exhibit at the Kunsthalle: Hamburger Schule – Das 19. Jahrhundert neu entdeckt (The 19th Century rediscovered).

He is interred at his family's gravesite at the Ohlsdorfer Friedhof.

Sources 
 Lutteroth, Ascan. In: Friedrich von Boetticher: Malerwerke des neunzehnten Jahrhunderts. Beitrag zur Kunstgeschichte. Vol.I, Dresden 1895, pgs.907 ff.
 Tilman Osterwold: Der Hamburger Maler Ascan Lutteroth. Dissertation, Innsbruck 1969
 Karoline Müller/Friedrich Rothe (Eds.): Victoria von Preußen 1840-1901 in Berlin 2001. Verein der Berliner Künstlerinnen 1867 e.V., Berlin 2001, pg.252 
 Hans F. Schweers: Gemälde in deutschen Museen. Katalog der ausgestellten und depotgelagerten Werke. 7 Bde., München 2005, .
 
 Lutteroth, Ascan. In: Hermann Alexander Müller: Biographisches Künstler-Lexikon. Verlag des Bibliographischen Instituts, Leipzig 1882, pgs.344 f.

External links 

More works by Lutteroth @ ArtNet

1842 births
1923 deaths
19th-century German painters
19th-century German male artists
German landscape painters
Düsseldorf school of painting
Artists from Hamburg
20th-century German painters
20th-century German male artists